A sceptre or scepter is a symbolic staff.

Sceptre or scepter may also refer to:

Places
 Sceptre, Saskatchewan, a village in Canada

Arts, entertainment, and media

Music
 Scepter Records, a record label
 Sceptre (Indian band), an Indian thrash metal band
 Skepta, UK Recording artist

Other uses in arts, entertainment, and media
 Scepter of Goth, early multiplayer game
 Sceptre (imprint), an imprint of Hodder & Stoughton

Science and technology
 Sceptre (fusion reactor), a z-pinch fusion reactor
 AT&T Sceptre, a graphics terminal made by AT&T from 1983 to 1986
 Sceptre Incorporated, a consumer electronics producer

Transportation
 Sceptre (yacht), 12-metre class yacht
 HMS Sceptre, the name given to five ships of the Royal Navy
 Humber Sceptre, a British car
 SlipStream Scepter, kit aircraft
 Studebaker Sceptre, a Studebaker prototype car; See List of Studebaker vehicles
 Toyota Camry (XV10), a car known as Toyota Scepter in Japan

Other uses
 Sceptre (horse), a racehorse
 "Scepter", a disc golf fairway driver by Infinite Discs